Wakefieldite-(Nd) is the neodymium analogue of the uncommon rare-earth element vanadate mineral wakefieldite. It is a member of the xenotime group.

Wakefieldite-(Nd) was first described in 2008 at the Arase mine, Kami city, Kōchi Prefecture, Shikoku Island, Japan. and published in 2011.

References

Neodymium minerals
Vanadate minerals
Tetragonal minerals
Minerals in space group 141
Minerals described in 2011